Flock, founded in 2002, is a biannual literary journal based in Jacksonville, Florida.

History and mission
Flock (formerly Fiction Fix) was founded by University of North Florida students and author, musician, artist, and UNF faculty member Mark Ari in 2002.  Its original Editor-in-Chief was Sarah Cotchaleovich, followed by Melissa Milburn, Thelma Young, and current editor-in-chief April Gray Wilder. The journal publishes "accessibly experimental" and "soulful" literature in both traditional and experimental forms. Since its inception the journal has been a part of a growing literary community in North East Florida and has attracted authors from across the United States and world. Between 2009 and 2013 the journal moved entirely online and began showcasing contemporary art. Under the name Fiction Fix, the journal published seventeen fiction issues, one issue of nonfiction, two poetry issues, and two winners of its novella award: "The Sleeping Wall" by Jane Downs and "Homesick Redux" by Daniel Coshnear. In 2016 the journal became Flock with an expanded mission to publish fully multi-genre issues twice a year.

Awards
The journal periodically opens for submissions to its Novella Award, offering publication to the winning submission.

See also
List of literary magazines

References

External links
 Official website

2002 establishments in Florida
Fiction magazines
Magazines established in 2002
Magazines published in Florida
Mass media in Jacksonville, Florida
Online literary magazines published in the United States
Quarterly magazines published in the United States
University of North Florida
Visual arts magazines published in the United States